Mr. Muscles is a fictional comic book superhero created in 1956 by writer Jerry Siegel for Charlton Comics, and drawn by Bill Fraccio for the first of two issues of his namesake comic, and by the team of penciler Charles Nicholas and inker Vince Alascia for the second. A young Dick Giordano provided the premiere issue's cover. Siegel, who co-created Superman, wrote both issues featuring Charlton's own muscleman.

Fictional character biography

Wrestler Brett Carson obtained super strength in the process of fighting the paralysis of polio (and refusing to accept the doctors' prognosis of permanent paralysis) and used it to fight crime. He was assisted by sidekicks Kid Muscles and Miss Muscles, who appeared in backup stories. With a superhero costume consisting of red-and-black wrestling tights with a yellow "M" insignia, the blond-haired hero is one of few who did not wear a mask and whose identity is publicly known. An additional character, Steeplejack, starred in a backup feature in the second issue.

The comic book Mr. Muscles ran two issues numbered #22–23 (March & Aug. 1956), the series having taken over the numbering of the comic Blue Beetle. The sole other known appearance of a character by this name was alongside other guests in writer-artist Steve Ditko's Creeper backup story, "Beware Mr. Wrinkles", in DC Comics' World's Finest Comics #254 (Jan. 1979).

References

External links
International Catalog of Superheroes: Mr. Muscles
Mr. Muscles at Don Markstein's Toonopedia. Archived from the original on March 10, 2016.

Charlton Comics superheroes
Charlton Comics titles
Comics characters introduced in 1956
Characters created by Jerry Siegel